Aisha Mughal  (Urdu: عائشہ مغل) is a Pakistani transgender rights expert and researcher.

Education
Mughal received her MPhil degree in human resource management from COMSATS University Islamabad.

Career
Mughal works in Ministry of Human Rights, Pakistan as a transgender rights expert and UNDP Expert Consultant. She has been working for transgender rights in Pakistan since 2015.

She has represented Pakistan in a National Delegation at the UN CEDAW (Convention on Elimination of Discrimination Against Women) committee in Geneva, Switzerland in 2020. The CEDAW is a committee that works for women rights, their equal access to health, education, political participation and employment. It was the very first time in history that a transgender person has represented any country for a reporting procedure of an official UN treaty review.

She has published research articles on Transgender people in peer reviewed journals. She played key role as part of National Task Force on Transgender Bill and  getting it approved to Transgender Persons (Protection of Rights) Act, 2018. She has also worked at National commission for Human Rights (NCHR), Government of Pakistan.

She has also taught in Quaid-i-Azam University for some time.

References

Pakistani humanists
Pakistani women activists
Transgender rights activists
Pakistani transgender people
Living people
Year of birth missing (living people)
Pakistani activists
Transgender women
Transgender academics
Women civil rights activists
21st-century Pakistani LGBT people